Sutherland, an electoral district of the Legislative Assembly in the Australian state of New South Wales, had two incarnations, from 1950 until 1971 and from 1988 until 1999.


Election results

Elections in the 1990s

1997 by-election

1995

1991

Elections in the 1980s

1988

1968 - 1988

Elections in the 1960s

1968

1965

1962

Elections in the 1950s

1959

1956

1953

1950

References

New South Wales state electoral results by district